The Edge is a various artists compilation, released by the Razor & Tie record label, on March 16, 2010.

The album's music is solely that of the alternative music genre, featuring popular bands prevalent in the genre. Many of the songs featured charted highly on either (or, in some cases, both) of the U.S. rock charts: the Mainstream Rock Tracks chart and the Modern Rock Tracks chart. While most of the tracks date from the 21st century of rock music, the featured Korn and Sublime songs date back to 1998 and 1996, respectively.

The two-disc set was a success on the U.S. charts, debuting at number four on the main Billboard 200 album chart, and topping both the Rock Albums and Alternative Albums charts as well.

Track listing

Disc one

Evanescence : "Bring Me to Life"
Thirty Seconds to Mars : "The Kill (Bury Me)"
Finger Eleven : "Paralyzer"
P.O.D. : "Alive"
Jet : "Are You Gonna Be My Girl"
Staind : "Right Here"
Korn : "Freak on a Leash"
Trapt : "Headstrong"
Simple Plan : "Welcome to My Life"
Taproot : "Poem"
Chevelle : "Send the Pain Below"
Panic! at the Disco : "I Write Sins Not Tragedies"

Disc two

Puddle of Mudd : "She Hates Me"
Yellowcard : "Ocean Avenue"
Alien Ant Farm : "Smooth Criminal"
Sum 41 : "In Too Deep"
Hoobastank : "Running Away"
Godsmack : "Awake"
Trust Company : "Downfall"
3 Doors Down : "Let Me Go"
Lifehouse : "First Time"
American Hi-Fi : "Flavor of the Weak"
Sublime : "Wrong Way"
Bloodhound Gang : "The Bad Touch"

References

2010 compilation albums